Little Flower High School is a convent school located at Pokharan Road No. 2 near Upvan Lake in Thane, Maharashtra, India.

The school is recognized as a high school by the Education Department of the government of Maharashtra.by Rev. Fr. Valerian Godinho. The institution has 2700 students on roll.

The school is administered by the Roman Catholic Diocese of Mumbai and under the religious jurisdiction of the Roman Catholic Archdiocese of Mumbai. The school provides education for Catholic boys and girls, and for other denominations.

Beginnings
Little Flower High School was established in 1972, in rented premises near Vartak Nagar by Rev. Fr. Valerian Godinho to cater to the educational needs of the Catholics and the non-Catholics of the industrial area. The school is located on its own extensive grounds.

Academics

Curriculum
The school academic year, which begins in June, comprises two terms: June–October and November–April. The course of studies has emphasis on the preparation for Secondary School Certificate Examination. Hindi is a compulsory subject and is taught from class III. The base and foundation of Basic Techniques in Education, are given due emphasis. Physical Training, Outdoor games are compulsory for all. Pupils are encouraged to join introduction to computing, Social Service Groups and take up Projects in Std. VIII, IX and X.

Examinations
There are four unit tests, one terminal examination and one final examination each year. The first terminal examination is held in October and the final examination in April. Minimum requirements for a student to be declared 'Pass' is 35% while for a student to attain distinction is 75%.

Facilities

Science laboratory

Library
The school has a collection of books on subjects ranging from reference books to fiction, non-fiction, biographies, encyclopedias, journals etc. The school subscribes to dailies and magazines. Reference books and texts are available for borrowing as well as for reference purpose.

House system
Students are divided into four houses. Each house is named after a personality in national history.

School council
The council is a student body established to put into practice the aims and objectives of the House System. The Council is made of the Prefect, Assistant Prefect, House Captain, House Leader as well as Class Monitors and Assistant Monitors of the classes and other representatives of the activities and organisations. The meetings of the council are conducted on a Parliamentary basis and the Council fulfils its purpose by assisting the Principal and the staff in carrying out affairs in the school, especially discipline.

Co-curricular activities
Co-curricular activities include fun fairs, picnics, camps, workshops, debates, scouts, guides and NCC.

The school offers professional training to the students:
  Competitive Examination Training
  Creative Arts
  Elementary Intermediate Training
  National Talent Search Training

See also 
 List of schools in Mumbai

References

External links
 Little Flower High School @ Thane Web

Catholic secondary schools in India
Christian schools in Maharashtra
Private schools in Maharashtra
Schools in Thane district
Education in Thane
Educational institutions established in 1972
1972 establishments in Maharashtra